John Hudson (23 July 1882 – 16 March 1961) was an Australian cricketer. He played six first-class matches for Tasmania between 1906 and 1912.

See also
 List of Tasmanian representative cricketers

References

External links
 

1882 births
1961 deaths
Australian cricketers
Tasmania cricketers
Cricketers from Launceston, Tasmania